Testify is the most current recording released by Dynamic Praise, A gospel choir from Oakwood College. This album was recorded live at Madison Mission SDA Church.

Track listing

Dynamic Praise albums
2007 live albums
Live gospel albums